Alavi (also Romanized as ‘Alavī; also known as Alitutal) is a village in Tork-e Sharqi Rural District, Jowkar District, Malayer County, Hamadan Province, Iran. As of the 2006 census, its population stands at 2,509, distributed among 576 families.

References 

Populated places in Malayer County